Motozintla (Motozintla de Mendoza) is a city and one of the 119 municipalities of Chiapas, in southern Mexico.

Motozintla occupies part of Mexico's border with Guatemala and is adjacent to the municipalities of Siltepec (to the north), Escuintla and Huixtla (to the west), Tuzantán and Tapachula (to the south), and Mazapa de Madero and El Porvenir (to the northeast). It covers an area of 782.5 km².

As of 2010, the municipality had a total population of 69,119, up from 59,875 as of 2005.

The municipality had 416 localities, the largest of which (with 2010 populations in parentheses) were: Motozintla de Mendoza (23,755), classified as urban, and Belisario Domínguez (2,011), classified as rural.

References

Municipalities of Chiapas